The Birmingham Bridge (known during construction as the Brady Street Bridge) is a bowstring arch bridge in Pittsburgh, Pennsylvania, which crosses over the Monongahela River. The bridge connects East Carson Street on the South Side with Fifth and Forbes Avenues going to Uptown, Oakland, and the Hill District. It is named in honor of the English city of Birmingham and also for the neighborhood it connects to, which was once called Birmingham, now a part of the South Side. Many locals also may refer to it with its unofficial name, the 22nd Street bridge.

History
The Birmingham Bridge was built in 1976. It replaced the South 22nd Street Bridge (aka Brady Street Bridge), which was demolished on May 29, 1978.  Six days before the demolition, Pittsburgh Police, Fire, and EMS responded to a construction worker who had pinned his leg near the top of the span.  After attempting unsuccessful rescues, they finally hoisted a surgeon to the site and were forced to amputate on site to save the worker's life.  After the Brady Street Bridge came down, railings from its remains were rescued by the Pittsburgh History and Landmarks Foundation and utilized in the construction of the Station Square station.

The Birmingham Bridge is notable for the dead end lanes that were originally to be part of a city belt system.  The project was canceled and the bridge rerouted. A pedestrian walkway runs along the downstream side of the bridge, ending at steps at the south abutment of the bridge.

On April 2, 2007 large sections of the bridge were shut down for repair.  The repair project was expected to finish on November 1, 2007. While the project did not complete on time, by late November all barricades had been removed and all lanes were again open. During the bridge rehabilitation, bike lanes were added along the outer sides of both the northbound and southbound traffic lanes.

On February 8, 2008 the bridge was closed for inspection after a motorist called 911 when the deck dropped several inches. PennDOT indicated that one of the rockers that support bridge beams slipped  and "feels it is in the best interest of the traveling public to close the outbound lanes at this time and conduct a thorough inspection to ensure the integrity of the structure.  In the early morning hours of Monday, March 3, 2008, the southbound deck reopened for to serve traffic in both directions, cars and buses only. On September 8, 2008, the northbound deck fully reopened and northbound traffic was relocated to it. The inner lane of the southbound deck remained closed, and southbound trucks were still barred from the span.

It was originally called the Brady Street Bridge during construction, but in March 1977 the Pennsylvania General Assembly renamed it the Birmingham Bridge at the behest of State Senator James A. Romanelli.

In the media 
In the TV show Fringe, the Birmingham Bridge collapsed in September 2007 from an unknown cause.

See also
Brady Street Bridge, the previous bridge at the same location
List of bridges documented by the Historic American Engineering Record in Pennsylvania
List of crossings of the Monongahela River
Birmingham, Allegheny County, Pennsylvania, the former borough which it served and bearing its namesake.

References

External links
Brady Street Bridge at pghbridges.com
Birmingham Bridge at pghbridges.com

Bridges in Pittsburgh
Bridges over the Monongahela River
Bridges completed in 1976
Tied arch bridges in the United States
Road bridges in Pennsylvania
1976 establishments in Pennsylvania
Steel bridges in the United States